Rock Arena was a weekly Australian music television show broadcast by the ABC from 23 February 1982 until 31 January 1989. The program featured live music performances, and interviews with bands and singers. The performances were presented as if the artist was in a pub or in concert.

Rock Arena was hosted by Andrew Peters, Suzanne Dowling, Peter Holland and Glenn Shorrock. The executive producer was Grant Rule and the vision mixer was Joe Murray.

See also
 List of Australian music television shows
 List of Australian television series
 List of Australian Broadcasting Corporation programs
 Countdown

References

External links
 

1982 Australian television series debuts
1989 Australian television series endings
Australian Broadcasting Corporation original programming
Australian music television series
Australian non-fiction television series